Duotian is a township-level division
situated in Xinghua, Jiangsu, China.

See also 
List of township-level divisions of Jiangsu

References 
https://web.archive.org/web/20120426051449/http://www.xhdt.gov.cn/

Township-level divisions of Jiangsu